Leonor or Léonor is a short form of the given name Eleanor.

People bearing the name include:

Leonor Beleza (born 1948), Portuguese politician
Leonor Briones (born 1940), Filipino academic and civil servant
Leonor de Cisneros  (died 1568), Spanish Protestant martyr
Leonor F. Loree (1858–1940), American civil engineer, lawyer and railroad executive
Leonor Fini (1907–1996), Argentine surrealist painter
Leonor Gonzalez Mina (born 1934), vocalist in the cumbia genre of Colombian music
Leonor López de Córdoba (1362–1420), advisor and confidant of Queen Catalina of Lancaster
Leonor Maia (born 1921), Portuguese film actress
Leonor Michaelis (1875–1949), German-born American biochemist and physician
Leonor Orosa-Goquinco (1917–2005), Filipino national artist in creative dance
Leonor Oyarzún (born 1922), First Lady of Chile, wife of former President Patricio Aylwin
Leonor Piuza (born 1978), Mozambican 800 metre runner
Leonor Poeiras (born 1980), Portuguese television presenter
Leonor Rivera (born 1893), the childhood sweetheart of Philippine national hero José Rizal
Leonor Sullivan (1902–1988), American politician
Leonor Telles de Menezes (1350–1386), queen consort of Portugal and regent in 1383–1385
Leonor Varela (born 1972), Chilean actress, and model
Leonor Watling (born 1975), Spanish film actress
Leonor, Princess of Asturias (born 2005), heir presumptive to the Spanish throne

See also
Leonore (disambiguation)

Feminine given names

et:Leonor
es:Leonor
fr:Leonor
it:Leonor
oc:Leonor
pt:Leonor